Sonia Purnell is a British writer and journalist who has worked at The Economist, The Daily Telegraph, and The Sunday Times. Her books include Clementine: The Life of Mrs. Winston Churchill, which was chosen as book of the year by The Telegraph and The Independent, and was a finalist for the Plutarch Award.

She also wrote the book and screenplay for the future film about Virginia Hall – A Woman of No Importance, produced by J. J. Abrams. It was chosen as a "Best Book of the Year" by NPR.

Bibliography

References

Year of birth missing (living people)
Place of birth missing (living people)
Living people
British newspaper journalists
British women journalists